George House (7 March 1892 – 8 February 1949) was a British Labour Party politician.

He originally worked as a printer, later becoming a steel erector. He was secretary of the Constructional Engineering Union from 1924 - 1939.

He was twice a member of the London County Council: representing Islington South from 1928 to 1931 and St Pancras North from 1937 to 1949.

He was elected at the 1945 general election as Member of Parliament (MP) for St Pancras North, but died in office less than four years later, aged 56.

References

External links 

1892 births
1949 deaths
Labour Party (UK) MPs for English constituencies
UK MPs 1945–1950
Members of London County Council
British trade union leaders